Gabriel Alejandro Robledo (born 14 June 1993) is an Argentine professional footballer who plays as a midfielder for Deportivo Laferrere.

Career
Robledo's career started with Huracán. He made the breakthrough into their first-team during the 2014 campaign, making his debut on 25 September in a Copa Argentina encounter with Banfield before appearing in league football for the first time in October versus Independiente Rivadavia. Huracán won promotion in 2014 to the Primera División, a league he featured once in; against Godoy Cruz on 27 February 2015. Robledo didn't appear again, leaving in 2016 to Deportivo Español of Primera B Metropolitana. He scored his first goal in May 2017 versus Villa San Carlos, in the midst of seventy-five games in three seasons.

In August 2019, Robledo completed a move to San Telmo.

Career statistics
.

Honours
Huracán
Copa Argentina: 2013–14

References

External links

1993 births
Living people
People from La Matanza Partido
Argentine footballers
Association football midfielders
Primera Nacional players
Argentine Primera División players
Primera B Metropolitana players
Club Atlético Huracán footballers
Deportivo Español footballers
San Telmo footballers
Deportivo Laferrere footballers
Sportspeople from Buenos Aires Province